A101 Yeni Mağazacılık A.Ş. or often shortened as A101 is a Turkish retail company founded in 2008, with their headquarters being located at Üsküdar, İstanbul.

It is one of the 3 markets that have locations in all 81 provinces of Turkey, alongside Bim and Şok. %79,21 percent of A101 is owned by Turgut Aydın Holding. Shipments are made from warehouses to stores with trucks belonging to A101.

History
A101 was founded on 28 March 2008 by Turgut Aydın in Istanbul. A101's main business model is being a discounter, just like their main competitor Bim. 

In April 2020, A101 launched their grocery delivery app called "A101 Kapıda".

On 30 December 2020, A101 opened their 10.001th store, thus taking the record of most store locations from their rivals Bim.

16 July 2016 custody operations
On 16 July 2016, six suspects accused of providing financial support to Fetulllah Terrorist Organization including A101's owner Turgut Aydın and some of A101's board members.

The six were detained along with 92 others over claims of providing financial support to FETO, the carrier of the deadly coup attempt on 15 July, according to a police source. On 19 August 2016, the suspects were released on orders of the Istanbul Chief Public Prosecutor's Office after they recorded their testimonies.

References

Discount stores
Retail companies of Turkey
Retail companies established in 2008